John Sharples may refer to:

 John Sharples, Sr. (1814–1876), Canadian politician and member of the Legislative Council of Quebec
 John Sharples, Jr. (1847–1913), his son and also a member of the Legislative Council of Quebec
 John Sharples (footballer, born 1934), played for Aston Villa and Walsall in the 1950s and 1960s
 John Sharples (footballer, born 1973), played for Manchester United, Heart of Midlothian, Ayr United and York City in the 1990s
 John Bradshaw Sharples (1845–1913), master craftsman, see public railways of Guyana